Coleford may refer to a number of settlements in England:
 Coleford, Devon
 Coleford, Gloucestershire
 Coleford, Somerset

See also
 Coalford, a village in Aberdeenshire, Scotland
 Coalford, an area of Jackfield, a village in Shropshire, England